Lake Valley (formerly, Bigler Lake Valley) is an unincorporated community in El Dorado County, California. It extends for  along the Upper Truckee River from Lake Tahoe to Meyers, at an elevation of 6207 feet (1892 m).

The place was founded in or before 1853. There was a pony express remount station at the top of the valley in the early 1860s. There used to be a railroad that ran down Lake Valley and terminated at a pier in Bijou.

References

Unincorporated communities in California
Unincorporated communities in El Dorado County, California
Pony Express stations